Tinaksite (chemical formula ) is a mineral found in northern Russia. Tinaksite can be grayish-white, yellowish, orange, or brown, and it is often found in charoite. Its name is derived from its composition: titanium (Ti), sodium (Na) potassium (K) and silicon (Si). The International Mineralogical Association first recognized tinaksite as a mineral in 1965.

References

External links

Calcium minerals
Sodium minerals
Potassium minerals
Inosilicates
Gemstones
Triclinic minerals
Minerals in space group 2